In the United States, a buydown is a mortgage financing technique where the buyer attempts to obtain a lower interest rate for at least the first few years of the mortgage. The seller of the property usually provides payments to the mortgage lending institution, which, in turn, lowers the buyer's monthly interest rate, and therefore, monthly payment. This is typically done for a period of about one to five years. In a seller's market, the seller might raise the purchase price to compensate for the costs of the buydown, but in most markets, it would not be to their advantage to use a buydown as an enticement if they are going to offset the benefit by raising the price.  In most cases, the buydown does not even involve the seller.  It is an arrangement between the lender and the buyer.

You may also use the buydown option on a refinance.

References

Related

Also similar is paying mortgage points.

Contract law
Personal finance